Çağlar Birinci (born 2 October 1985) is a Turkish former footballer who played as a central defender.

Club career
After a season with Denizlispor in the  2006–07 season, he secured a first-team place as a left-back. In the 2007–08 season, he was given the number 61 squad number, and became vice-captain., eventually becoming the captain. Çağlar joined Elazığspor when his contract expired on a free transfer and Akhisar Belediyespor the further season on 18 July 2014.

International career
Çağlar was selected for Turkey's 2010 FIFA World Cup qualification games against Armenia and Belgium. Çağlar made his debut against Belgium, starting as left-back.

Honours
Galatasaray
Süper Lig (2): 2011–12, 2012–13
Süper Kupa (1): 2012

References

External links

 
 
 
 
 
 

1985 births
People from Yomra
Living people
Turkish footballers
Turkey international footballers
Turkey B international footballers
Association football fullbacks
Association football defenders
Trabzonspor footballers
Orduspor footballers
Bakırköyspor footballers
Denizlispor footballers
İstanbulspor footballers
Galatasaray S.K. footballers
Elazığspor footballers
Akhisarspor footballers
Kayserispor footballers
Karşıyaka S.K. footballers
Giresunspor footballers
Altay S.K. footballers
Şanlıurfaspor footballers
Süper Lig players
TFF First League players
TFF Second League players